Randall Creek is a stream in the U.S. states of Nebraska and South Dakota.

Randall Creek took its name from nearby Fort Randall.

See also
List of rivers of South Dakota

References

Rivers of Boyd County, Nebraska
Rivers of Gregory County, South Dakota
Rivers of Nebraska
Rivers of South Dakota